Kool-Aid Man (sometimes referred to as the Kool-Aid Guy or Captain Kool-Aid or Kindor the Kool-Aid Man) is the official mascot for Kool-Aid, a brand of flavored drink mix. The character CT has appeared on television and in print advertising as a fun-loving, gigantic, and joyful anthropomorphic pitcher filled with "The Original Flavor" Cherry Kool-Aid. He is typically featured answering the call of children by smashing through walls or furnishings and then holding a pitcher filled with Kool-Aid while saying his catchphrase, "Oh yeah!" He had a comic series produced by Marvel where he fought evil villains called "Thirsties" and even fought a man engulfed in fire named Scorch. He can also come in many different colors such as red, blue, green, and purple.

History
The precursor to Kool-Aid Man, "the Pitcher Man", was created on July 10, 1954. Marvin Potts, an art director for a New York advertising agency, was hired by General Foods to create an image that would accompany the slogan "A 5-cent package makes two quarts." Inspired by watching his young son draw smiley faces on a frosted window, Potts created the Pitcher Man, a glass pitcher with a wide smile emblazoned on its side and filled with Kool-Aid. It was one of several designs he created, but the only one that stuck, and General Foods began to use the Pitcher Man in all of its advertisements. The character's face was sometimes animated in synchronization with the jingle.

In 1974, arms and legs were added and Kool-Aid Man was introduced as a 6-foot-tall pitcher of cherry Kool-Aid, reportedly voiced by Grey Advertising composer Richard Berg and created by Alan Kupchick and Harold Karp (of Grey Advertising). Children, parched from playing, or other various activities, typically exchanged a few words referring to their thirst, then put a hand to the side of their mouths and shouted "Hey, Kool-Aid!", whereupon Kool-Aid Man made his grand entrance, breaking through walls, fences, ceilings, or furnishings, uttering the famous words "Oh yeah!", then poured the dehydrated youngsters a glass of Kool-Aid. In 1979, the character's mouth was again animated to move in synchronization with the voice actor's singing and/or dialogue.

From at least 1979 to 1981, the character was known in Canada as Captain Kool-Aid.

By the 1980s, Kool-Aid Man had attained pop-culture icon status, and in 1983, was the subject of two video games for the Atari 2600 and Intellivision systems. He was also given his own short-lived comic book series (prior to that, he starred in a two-issue series published by the General Foods Corporation in 1975) called The Adventures of Kool-Aid Man. It ran for three issues under Marvel Comics from 1983 to 1985 and continued with issues #4-9 under Archie Comics, with art by Dan DeCarlo, from 1987 to 1990. It featured the Thirsties, a group of anthropomorphic sun-like creatures, as villains.

In 1994, the live-action character was retired, and from then until 2008, the character became entirely computer-generated, but other characters, such as the children, remained live-action. In 1999, singer and voice actor Frank Simms began voicing the character. In 2009, the live-action character returned, playing street basketball and battling "Cola" to stay balanced on a log, where he was voiced by Pat Duke.  Keith Hudson also briefly voiced the character in several Kraft Foods commercials in 2013 and 2014. In 2016, Brock Powell took over the role for Kool-Aid's major rebranding, including collaborations with Progressive automotive and Nickelodeon and voiced the character for several digital campaigns until officially "passing the pitcher" in 2019. Voice actor Matt Howell briefly voiced the character in several commercials in 2020. As of 2020, the character is voiced by Scott Golden.

In popular culture 

American artist David Hammons used Kool-Aid and incorporated a stamp of the Kool-Aid Man for a piece that hung in the Museum of Modern Art in New York City.

The Kool-Aid Man appeared as a supporting character on the animated television show Family Guy, and in more prominent appearances, The Simpsons and Robot Chicken. He is also a playable character in Family Guy: The Quest for Stuff.

In May 2016, the Kool-Aid Man appeared in a television commercial for the American insurance company Progressive, voiced again by Brock Powell.

In December 2018, the Kool-Aid Man appeared with rapper Lil Jon in his Christmas song, "All I Really Want for Christmas". As of January 2023, the video has 4.3 million views, 73,000 likes and 3,088 comments on YouTube. Critical reception was positive. Fast Company called it "epic and bonkers". Entertainment Weekly said, "Lil Jon has given us all a true gift". Billboard called it "the greatest Christmas song of all time". The Houston Chronicle said, "you have to see this".

In a Super Bowl LIV TV ad in 2020, he, alongside Mr. Clean, appeared in a commercial for fellow Kraft Heinz product Planters, shown as an attendee of the funeral of Mr. Peanut. His tears end up causing a new, baby Mr. Peanut to grow from the ground.

Reception
Time magazine included the Kool-Aid Man on a list of the "Top 10 Creepiest Product Mascots", saying, "Our biggest gripe with Kool-Aid Man: Why did he have to cause such a mess every time he entered the scene?"

References

External links
 Kool-Aid Man Atari 2600 game
 Comic books
 Jamie Knobler, "Kool-Aid: 75 years of smiles", The Loquitur, September 9, 2002

Mascots introduced in 1954
Drink advertising characters
Marvel Comics characters
Archie Comics characters
Fictional anthropomorphic characters
Animated characters
Corporate mascots
Fictional food characters
Male characters in advertising